Hugo Antonio Peña Segura (6 May 1936 – 13 July 2007) was a Guatemalan footballer. He competed in the men's tournament at the 1968 Summer Olympics.

References

External links
 

1936 births
2007 deaths
Guatemalan footballers
Guatemala international footballers
Olympic footballers of Guatemala
Footballers at the 1968 Summer Olympics
Sportspeople from Guatemala City
Universidad de San Carlos players
Association football forwards